The black hole information paradox is a puzzle that appears when the predictions of quantum mechanics and general relativity are combined. The theory of general relativity predicts the existence of black holes that are regions of spacetime from which nothing — not even light — can escape.  In the 1970s, Stephen Hawking applied the rules of quantum mechanics to such systems and found that an isolated black hole would emit a form of radiation called Hawking radiation.  Hawking also argued that the detailed form of the radiation would be independent of the initial state of the black hole and would depend only on its mass, electric charge and angular momentum. The information paradox appears when one considers a process in which a black hole is formed through a physical process and then evaporates away entirely through Hawking radiation. Hawking's calculation suggests that the final state of radiation would retain information only about the total mass, electric charge and angular momentum of the initial state. Since many different states can have the same mass, charge and angular momentum this suggests that many initial physical states could evolve into the same final state. Therefore, information about the details of the initial state would be permanently lost. However, this violates a core precept of both classical and quantum physics—that, in principle, the state of a system at one point in time should determine its value at any other time. Specifically, in quantum mechanics the state of the system is encoded by its wave function.  The evolution of the wave function is determined by a unitary operator, and unitarity implies that the wave function at any instant of time can be used to determine the wave function either in the past or the future.

It is now generally believed that information is preserved in black-hole evaporation. This means that the predictions of quantum mechanics are correct whereas Hawking's original argument that relied on general relativity must be corrected.  However, views differ as to how, precisely, Hawking's calculation should be corrected. In recent years, several extensions of the original paradox have been explored. Taken together these puzzles about black hole evaporation have  implications for how gravity and quantum mechanics must be combined, leading to the information paradox remaining an active field of research within quantum gravity.

Relevant principles 

In quantum mechanics, the evolution of the state is governed by the Schrödinger equation. The Schrödinger equation obeys two principles that are relevant for the paradox. These are the principles of quantum determinism, which  means that given a present wave function, its future changes are uniquely determined by the evolution operator and also the principle of reversibility, which refers to the fact that the evolution operator has an inverse, meaning that the past wave functions are similarly unique. The combination of the two means that information must always be preserved.  In this context "information" is used to refer to all the details of the state and the statement that information must be preserved means that details corresponding to an earlier time can always be reconstructed at a later time.

Mathematically, the Schrödinger equation implies that the wavefunction at a time t1 can be related to the wavefunction at a time t2 by means of a unitary operator.

Since the unitary operator is bijective, the wavefunction at t2 can be obtained from the wavefunction at t1 and vice versa.

The reversibility of time-evolution described above applies only at the microscopic level since the wavefunction provides a complete description of the state. It should not be conflated with thermodynamic irreversibility.  A process may appear to be irreversible if one keeps track only of coarse-grained features of the system and does not keep track of its microscopic details, as is usually done in thermodynamics. However, at the microscopic level the principles of quantum mechanics imply that every process is completely reversible.

Starting in the mid-1970s, Stephen Hawking and  Jacob Bekenstein put forward theoretical arguments that suggested that black-hole evaporation loses information, and is therefore inconsistent with unitarity. Crucially, these arguments were meant to apply at the microscopic level and suggested that black-hole evaporation is not only thermodynamically irreversible but microscopically irreversible. This contradicts the principle of unitarity described above and leads to the information paradox. Since the paradox suggested that quantum mechanics would be violated by black-hole formation and evaporation, Hawking framed the paradox in terms of the "breakdown of predictability in gravitational collapse". 

The arguments for microscopic irreversibility were backed by Hawking's calculation of the spectrum of radiation emitted by isolated black holes. This calculation utilized the framework of general relativity and   quantum field theory.  The calculation of Hawking radiation is performed at the black-hole horizon; for a large enough black hole the curvature at the horizon is small and therefore both these theories should be valid.  Hawking relied on the no-hair theorem to arrive at the conclusion that radiation emitted by black holes would depend only on a few macroscopic parameters such as the black hole's mass, charge and spin and not on the details of the initial state that led to the formation of the black hole. Moreover, the argument for information loss relied on the causal structure of the black-hole spacetime, which suggests that information in the interior should not affect any observation in the exterior including observations performed on the radiation emitted by the black hole.  If so, the region of spacetime outside the black hole would lose information about the state of the interior after black-hole evaporation leading to the loss of information.

Today, some physicists believe that the holographic principle (specifically the AdS/CFT duality) demonstrates that Hawking's conclusion was incorrect, and that information is in fact preserved.

Black hole evaporation 

In 1973–1975, Stephen Hawking showed that black holes should slowly radiate away energy and Hawking later argued that this leads to a contradiction with unitarity. Hawking used the classical no-hair theorem to argue that the form of this radiation – called Hawking radiation – would be completely independent of the initial state of the star or matter that collapsed to form the black hole. Hawking argued that the process of radiation would continue until the black hole had evaporated completely. At the end of this process, all the initial energy in the black hole would have been transferred to the radiation. But, according to Hawking's argument, the radiation would retain no information about the initial state and therefore information about the initial state would be lost.   

More specifically, Hawking argued that the pattern of radiation emitted from the black hole would be random, with a probability distribution controlled only by the initial temperature, charge and angular momentum of the black hole and not by the initial state of the collapse. The state produced by such a probabilistic process is called a mixed state in quantum mechanics. Therefore, Hawking argued that if the star or material that collapsed to form the black hole started in a specific pure quantum state, the process of evaporation would transform the pure state into a mixed state. This is inconsistent with the unitarity of quantum-mechanical evolution discussed above.  

The loss of information can be quantified in terms of the change in the fine-grained von Neumann entropy of the state. A pure state is assigned a von Neumann entropy of 0 whereas a mixed state has a finite entropy. The unitary evolution of a state according to Schrödinger's equation preserves the entropy. Therefore Hawking's argument suggests that the process of black-hole evaporation cannot be described within the framework of unitary evolution. Although this paradox is often phrased in terms of quantum mechanics, the evolution from a pure state to a mixed state is also inconsistent with  Liouville's theorem in classical physics. (see e.g.).

(See, for example, section 2.2 of.)
There are two important aspects of the formula above. The first is that the form of the radiation depends only on a single parameter, the temperature, even though the initial state of the black hole cannot be characterized by one parameter. Second, the formula implies that the black hole radiates mass at a rate given by  where a is constant related to fundamental constants, including the Stefan–Boltzmann constant and certain properties of the black hole spacetime called its greybody factors.

The temperature of the black hole is in turn dependent on the mass, charge and angular momentum of the black hole. For a Schwarzschild black hole the temperature is given by

The important aspect of the formulas above is they suggest that the final gas of radiation formed through this process depends only on the black hole's temperature and is independent of other details of the initial state. This leads to the following paradox. Consider two distinct initial states that collapse to form a Schwarzschild black hole of the same mass. Even though the states were distinct to start with, since the mass (and, hence, the temperature) of the black holes is the same, they will emit the same Hawking radiation. Once the black holes evaporate completely, in both cases, one will be left with a featureless gas of radiation. This gas cannot be used to distinguish between the two initial states, and therefore information has been lost.

It is now widely believed that the reasoning leading to the paradox above is flawed. Several solutions have been put forward that are reviewed below.

Popular culture 
The information paradox has received coverage in the popular media and has been described in popular-science books. Some of this coverage resulted from a widely publicized  bet made in 1997 between John Preskill on the one hand with Hawking and Kip Thorne on the other that information was not lost in black holes. The scientific debate on the paradox was described in a popular book published in 2008 by Leonard Susskind called The Black Hole War. (The book carefully notes that the 'war' was purely a scientific one, and that at a personal level, the participants remained friends.) The book states that Hawking was eventually persuaded that black-hole evaporation was unitary by the holographic principle, which was first proposed by 't Hooft, further developed by Susskind and later  given a precise string theory interpretation by the AdS/CFT correspondence. In 2004, Hawking also conceded the 1997 bet, paying Preskill with a baseball encyclopedia "from which information can be retrieved at will" although Thorne refused to concede.

Solutions 

Since the 1997 proposal of the AdS/CFT correspondence, the predominant belief among physicists is that information is indeed preserved in black hole evaporation. However, there are broadly two main streams of thought about how this happens. Within, what might broadly be termed, the "string theory community", the dominant idea is that Hawking radiation is not precisely thermal but receives quantum correlations that encode information about the black hole's interior. This viewpoint has been the subject of extensive recent research and received further support in 2019 when researchers amended the computation of the entropy of the Hawking radiation in certain models, and showed that the radiation is in fact dual to the black hole interior at late times. Hawking himself was influenced by this view and in 2004, published a paper  that assumed the AdS/CFT correspondence and argued that quantum perturbations of the event horizon could allow information to escape from a black hole, which would resolve the information paradox. In this perspective, it is the event horizon of the black hole that is important and not the black-hole singularity.

On the other hand, within, what might broadly be termed, the "loop quantum gravity community", the dominant belief is that to resolve the information paradox, it is important to understand how the black-hole singularity is resolved. These scenarios are broadly called remnant scenarios since information does not emerge gradually but remains in the black-hole interior only to emerge at the end of black-hole evaporation.

Other possibilities are also studied by researchers, which include a  modification of the laws of quantum mechanics to allow for non-unitary time evolution.

Some of these solutions are described at greater length below.

Small-corrections resolution to the paradox  
This idea suggests that Hawking's computation fails to keep track of small corrections that are eventually sufficient to preserve information about the initial state. This can be thought of as being analogous to what happens during the mundane process of "burning": the radiation produced appears to be thermal but  its fine-grained features encode the precise details of the object that was burnt. This idea is consistent with reversibility, as required by quantum mechanics.  It is the dominant idea in, what might broadly be termed, the string-theory approach to quantum gravity.

More precisely, this line of resolution suggests that Hawking's computation is corrected so that the two point correlator computed by Hawking and described above becomes

and higher-point correlators are similarly corrected

The equations above utilize a concise notation and the correction factors  may depend on the temperature, the frequencies of the operators that enter the correlation function and other details of the black hole.

Such corrections were initially explored by Maldacena in a simple version of the paradox. The mechanism that allowed the right small corrections to form was initially postulated in terms of a loss of exact locality in quantum gravity so that the black-hole interior and the radiation were described by the same degrees of freedom. Recent developments suggest that such a mechanism can be realized precisely within semiclassical gravity and allows information to escape. See § Recent developments.

Fuzzball resolution to the paradox  

Some researchers, most notably Samir Mathur,  have argued  that the small corrections required to preserve information cannot be obtained while preserving the semiclassical form of the black-hole interior and instead require a modification of the black-hole geometry to a fuzzball.

The defining characteristic of the fuzzball is that it has structure at the horizon scale. This should be contrasted with the conventional picture of the black-hole interior as a largely-featureless region of space. For a large enough black hole, tidal effects are very small at the black-hole horizon and remain small in the interior until one approaches the black-hole singularity. Therefore, in the conventional picture, an observer who crosses the horizon may not even realize that they have done so until they start approaching the singularity. In contrast, the fuzzball proposal suggests that the black hole horizon is not empty. Consequently, it is also not information free since the details of the  structure at the surface of the horizon preserve information about the initial state of the black hole. This structure also affects the outgoing Hawking radiation and thereby allows information to escape from the fuzzball.

The fuzzball proposal is supported by the existence of a large number of gravitational solutions called microstate geometries.

The firewall proposal can be thought of as a variant of the fuzzball proposal except that it posits that the black-hole interior is replaced with a firewall rather than a fuzzball.  Operationally, the difference between the fuzzball and the firewall proposals has to do with whether an observer crossing the horizon of the black hole encounters high-energy matter, suggested by the firewall proposal, or merely low-energy structure, suggested by the fuzzball proposal. The firewall proposal also originated with an exploration of Mathur's argument that small corrections are insufficient to resolve the information paradox.

The fuzzball and firewall proposals have been questioned for lacking an appropriate mechanism that can generate structure at the horizon scale.

Strong-quantum-effects resolution to the paradox

In the final stages of black-hole evaporation, quantum effects become important and cannot be ignored. The precise understanding of this phase of black-hole evaporation requires a complete theory of quantum gravity. Within, what might be termed, the loop-quantum-gravity approach to black holes, it is believed that understanding this phase of evaporation is crucial to resolving the information paradox.

This perspective holds that Hawking's computation is reliable until the final stages of black-hole evaporation when information suddenly escapes.  An alternative possibility along the same lines is that black-hole evaporation might simply stop when the black hole becomes Planck-sized. Such scenarios are called "remnant scenarios".

An appealing aspect of this perspective is that a significant deviation from classical and semiclassical gravity is needed only in the regime in which the effects of quantum gravity are expected to dominate.
On the other hand, this idea implies that just before the sudden escape of information, a very small black hole must be able to store an arbitrary amount of information and have a very large number of internal states. Therefore, researchers who follow this idea must take care to avoid the common criticism of remnant-type scenarios, which is that they might may violate  the Bekenstein bound and lead to a violation of effective field theory due to the production of remnants as virtual particles in ordinary scattering events.

Soft-hair resolution to the paradox  
In 2016, Hawking, Perry and Strominger noted that black holes must contain "soft hair".  Particles that have no rest mass, like photons and gravitons, can exist with arbitrarily low-energy and are called soft particles. The soft-hair resolution posits that information about the initial state is stored in such soft particles. The existence of such soft hair is a peculiarity of four-dimensional asymptotically flat space and therefore this resolution to the paradox does not carry over to black holes in anti-de Sitter space or black holes in other dimensions.

Information is irretrievably lost
A minority view within the theoretical physics community is that information is genuinely lost when black holes form and evaporate.
This conclusion follows if one assumes that the predictions of semiclassical gravity and the causal structure of the black-hole spacetime are exact.

However, this conclusion leads to the loss of unitarity. Banks, Susskind and Peskin argued that, in some cases, loss of unitarity also implies violation of energy–momentum conservation or locality, but this argument may possibly be evaded in systems with a large number of degrees of freedom. According to Roger Penrose, loss of unitarity in quantum systems is not a problem: quantum measurements are by themselves already non-unitary. Penrose claims that quantum systems will in fact no longer evolve unitarily as soon as gravitation comes into play, precisely as in black holes. The Conformal Cyclic Cosmology advocated by Penrose critically depends on the condition that information is in fact lost in black holes. This new cosmological model might in the future be tested experimentally by detailed analysis of the cosmic microwave background radiation (CMB): if true, the CMB should exhibit circular patterns with slightly lower or slightly higher temperatures.   In November 2010, Penrose and V. G. Gurzadyan announced they had found evidence of such circular patterns, in data from the Wilkinson Microwave Anisotropy Probe (WMAP) corroborated by data from the BOOMERanG experiment.  The significance of the findings was subsequently debated by others.

Along similar lines, Modak, Ortíz, Peña and Sudarsky, have argued that the paradox can be dissolved by invoking foundational issues of quantum theory often referred as the measurement problem of quantum mechanics. This work was built on an earlier proposal by Okon and Sudarsky on the benefits of objective collapse theory in a much broader context. The original motivation of these studies was the long-standing  proposal of Roger Penrose wherein collapse of the wave-function is said to be inevitable in the presence of black holes (and even under the influence of gravitational field). Experimental verification of collapse theories is an ongoing effort.

Other proposed resolutions  
Some other resolutions to the paradox have also been explored. These are listed briefly below.

Information is stored in a large remnant
This idea suggests that Hawking radiation stops before the black hole reaches the Planck size. Since the black hole never evaporates, information about its initial state can remain inside the black hole and the paradox disappears. However, there is no accepted mechanism that would allow Hawking radiation to stop while the black hole remains macroscopic.

Information is stored in a baby universe that separates from our own universe.
Some models of gravity, such as the Einstein–Cartan theory of gravity which extends general relativity to matter with intrinsic angular momentum (spin) predict the formation of such baby universes. No violation of known general principles of physics is needed. There are no physical constraints on the number of the universes, even though only one remains observable.
However, it is difficult to test the Einstein–Cartan theory because its predictions are significantly different from general-relativistic ones only at extremely high densities.

Information is encoded in the correlations between future and past
The final-state proposal suggests that boundary conditions must be imposed at the black-hole singularity which, from a causal perspective, is to the future of all events in the black-hole interior. This helps to reconcile black-hole evaporation with unitarity but it contradicts the intuitive idea of causality and locality of time-evolution.

quantum-channel theory
In 2014, Chris Adami argued that analysis using quantum channel theory causes any apparent paradox to disappear; Adami rejects  black hole complementarity, arguing instead that no space-like surface contains duplicated quantum information.

Recent developments 

Significant progress was made in 2019, when starting with work by Penington and Almheiri, Engelhardt, Marolf and Maxfield, researchers were able to compute the von Neumann entropy of the radiation emitted by black holes in specific models of quantum gravity. These calculations showed that, in these models, the entropy of this radiation first rises and then falls back to zero. As explained above, one way to frame the information paradox is that Hawking's calculation appears to show that the von Neumann entropy of Hawking radiation increases throughout the lifetime of the black hole. However, if the black hole formed from a pure state with zero entropy, unitarity implies that the entropy of the Hawking radiation must decrease back to zero once the black hole evaporates completely. Therefore, the results above provide a resolution to the information paradox, at least in the specific models of gravity considered in these models.

These calculations compute the entropy by first analytically continuing the spacetime to a Euclidean spacetime and then using the replica trick. The path integral that computes the entropy receives contributions from novel Euclidean configurations called "replica wormholes". (These wormholes exist in a Wick rotated spacetime and should not be conflated with wormholes in the original spacetime.) The inclusion of these wormhole geometries in the computation prevents the entropy from increasing indefinitely.

These calculations also imply that for sufficiently old black holes, one can perform operations on the Hawking radiation that affect the black hole interior. This result has implications for the related firewall paradox, and provides evidence for the physical picture suggested by the ER=EPR proposal, black hole complementarity and the Papadodimas–Raju proposal.

It has been noted that the models used to perform the Page curve computations above have consistently involved theories where the graviton itself has a mass, unlike the real world where the graviton is massless. These models have also involved a "nongravitational bath", which can be thought of as an artificial interface where gravity ceases to act. It has also been argued that a key technique used in the Page-curve computations, called the "island proposal", would be inconsistent in standard theories of gravity with a Gauss law. This would suggest that the Page curve computations are inapplicable to realistic black holes and only work in special toy models of gravity. The validity or otherwise of these criticisms remains under investigation and there is no general agreement in the research community.

In 2020, Laddha, Prabhu, Raju and Shrivastava argued that, as a result of the effects of quantum gravity, information should always be available outside the black hole. This would imply that the von Neumann entropy of the region outside the black hole always remains zero, as opposed to the proposal above, where the von Neumann entropy first rises and then falls. Extending this, Raju argued that Hawking's error was to assume that the region outside the black hole would have no information about its interior.

Hawking formalized this assumption in terms of a "principle of ignorance". The principle of ignorance is correct in classical gravity, when quantum-mechanical effects are neglected, by virtue of the no-hair theorem.  It is also correct when only quantum-mechanical effects are considered but gravitational effects are neglected. But Raju has argued that, when both quantum mechanical and gravitational effects are accounted for, the principle of ignorance should be replaced by a "principle of holography of information" which would imply just the opposite: all the information about the interior can be regained from the exterior through suitably precise measurements.

The two recent resolutions of the information paradox described above — via replica wormholes and the holography of information — share the common feature that observables in the black-hole interior also describe observables far from the black hole. This implies a loss of exact locality in quantum gravity. Although this loss of locality is very small, it persists over large distance scales. This feature has been challenged by some researchers.

See also

 AdS/CFT correspondence
 Beyond black holes
 Black hole complementarity
 Cosmic censorship hypothesis
 Firewall (physics)
 Fuzzball (string theory)
 Holographic principle
 List of paradoxes
 Maxwell's Demon
 No-hair theorem
 No-hiding theorem
 Thorne–Hawking–Preskill bet

References

External links
Black Hole Information Loss Problem, a USENET physics FAQ page
. Discusses methods of attack on the problem, and their apparent shortcomings.
 Report on Hawking's 2004 theory in Nature.
  Stephen Hawking's purported solution to the black hole unitarity paradox.
 Hawking and unitarity: a July 2005 discussion of the information loss paradox and Stephen Hawking's role in it
 The Hawking Paradox - BBC Horizon documentary (2005)
 
 A Black Hole Mystery Wrapped in a Firewall Paradox 

Black holes
Physical paradoxes
Relativistic paradoxes